Bøylefoss is a village in Froland municipality in Agder county, Norway. The village is located along the river Nidelva at the location of the Bøylefoss waterfall. The river is dammed so the waterfall is no longer visible. The water is piped downhill to the Bøylefoss power plant on the shore of the river. There is a very small village near the power plant also called Bøylefoss.

References

Villages in Agder
Froland